Lenina is a rural locality (a khutor) in Verkhnekhotemlsky Selsoviet Rural Settlement, Fatezhsky District, Kursk Oblast, Russia. Population:

Geography 
The khutor is located on the Verkhny Khoteml Brook (a link tributary of the Usozha in the basin of the Svapa), 102 km from the Russia–Ukraine border, 39 km north-west of Kursk, 6.5 km south of the district center – the town Fatezh, 2.5 km from the selsoviet center – Verkhny Khoteml.

 Climate
Lenina has a warm-summer humid continental climate (Dfb in the Köppen climate classification).

Transport 
Lenina is located 2 km from the federal route  Crimea Highway as part of the European route E105, 7.5 km from the road of regional importance  (Fatezh – Dmitriyev), 29 km from the road  (Kursk – Ponyri), 3 km from the road  (Fatezh – 38K-018), 2 km from the road of intermunicipal significance  (M2 "Crimea Highway" – Mirolyubovo), 34.5 km from the nearest railway halt 521 km (railway line Oryol – Kursk).

The rural locality is situated 41 km from Kursk Vostochny Airport, 160 km from Belgorod International Airport and 232 km from Voronezh Peter the Great Airport.

References

Notes

Sources

Rural localities in Fatezhsky District